Donald H. Cookman is an American politician and a former Democratic member of the West Virginia Senate representing District 15 in 2013 and 2014.

He was a circuit court judge for 20 years prior to being appointed to the state senate in January 2013.

Election results

References

Living people
Democratic Party West Virginia state senators
Place of birth missing (living people)
Year of birth missing (living people)
People from Romney, West Virginia
West Virginia University College of Law alumni
West Virginia lawyers
West Virginia Mountaineers football players
West Virginia circuit court judges
20th-century American judges
21st-century American judges
20th-century American lawyers